The Duchy of Mecklenburg-Stargard, also simply known as Mecklenburg-Stargard, and also as the Duchy of Stargard was a feudal district duchy in Mecklenburg within the Holy Roman Empire. Its capital was Burg Stargard. It was ruled by the House of Mecklenburg. The state was formed in 1352 from part of the Duchy of Mecklenburg-Schwerin, and existed until 1471, when it was incorporated into the Duchy of Mecklenburg.<ref>Friedrich Wigger, Stammtafeln des Großherzoglichen Hauses von Meklenburg in Verein für Mecklenburgische Geschichte und Altertumskunde: Jahrbücher des Vereins für Mecklenburgische Geschichte und Altertumskunde. Vol. 50 (1885), p. 111-326.</ref>

The main part of the Duchy of Mecklenburg-Stargard comprised the Lordship of Stargard in what is now the state of Mecklenburg-Western Pomerania, an area in the border area between Brandenburg, Pomerania and Mecklenburg. The lordship was named after the medieval castle in Stargard. Smaller areas were Sternberg and the Eldenburg with the historic country Ture.

Rulers
The ruling dukes were –
John I, Duke (1352–1392/93)
Albert I, Duke (1392/93–1397)
John II, Duke (1392/93–1416)
Ulrich I, Duke (1392/93–1417)
John III, Duke (1416–1438)
Albert II, co-Duke (1417–1421/23)
Henry I Gaunt, Duke (1417–1466)
Ulrich II, Duke (1466–1471)inherited by Mecklenburg-Schwerin to unite Mecklenburg''

See also
Burg Stargard
List of rulers of Mecklenburg

Notes

References

States and territories established in 1352
States and territories disestablished in 1471
Mecklenburg-Stargard
 
Mecklenburg-Stargard
Former monarchies